The 1978 DFB-Pokal Final decided the winner of the 1977–78 DFB-Pokal, the 35th season of Germany's knockout football cup competition. It was played on 15 April 1978 at the Parkstadion in Gelsenkirchen. 1. FC Köln won the match 2–0 against Fortuna Düsseldorf, to claim their 3rd cup title.

Route to the final
The DFB-Pokal began with 128 teams in a single-elimination knockout cup competition. There were a total of six rounds leading up to the final. Teams were drawn against each other, and the winner after 90 minutes would advance. If still tied, 30 minutes of extra time was played. If the score was still level, a replay would take place at the original away team's stadium. If still level after 90 minutes, 30 minutes of extra time was played. If the score was still level, a penalty shoot-out was used to determine the winner.

Note: In all results below, the score of the finalist is given first (H: home; A: away).

Match

Details

References

External links
 Match report at kicker.de 
 Match report at WorldFootball.net
 Match report at Fussballdaten.de 

Fortuna Düsseldorf matches
1. FC Köln matches
1977–78 in German football cups
1978
Sports competitions in Gelsenkirchen
20th century in Gelsenkirchen
April 1978 sports events in Europe